Ezekiel Alebua  (June 1946 – 7 August 2022) was the third Prime Minister of the Solomon Islands from 1 December 1986 until 28 March 1989. He served as Foreign Minister from 1981 to 1982. Alebua was the premier of Guadalcanal province from 1998 to 2003, and antagonised some people in that area for not supporting moves to declare that province independent.

In July 1988, Alebua was appointed to the Privy Council of the United Kingdom, and was thus entitled to the prefix "The Right Honourable" for life.

He was wounded in an assassination attempt by Harold Keke's group on 1 June 2001. During his prominence in national politics during the 1980s, Alebua was a member of the conservative Solomon Islands United Party.

Alebua died on 7 August 2022, following a prolonged illness.

References

Further reading

1946 births
2022 deaths
Prime Ministers of the Solomon Islands
People from Guadalcanal Province
Members of the National Parliament of the Solomon Islands
Members of the Privy Council of the United Kingdom
Foreign Ministers of the Solomon Islands